Hugh Morris Gloster (May 11, 1911 - February 16, 2002) was the seventh president of Morehouse College, responsible for establishing the Morehouse School of Medicine and the international studies program,. He was also one of the founders of the College Language Association.

Early years
Hugh Gloster was born in Brownsville, Tennessee to John and Dora Gloster and grew up in Memphis.

During World War II, Gloster was USO Program Director at Fort Huachuca and USO Associate Regional Executive in Atlanta.  After that, he served as an administrator with the USO and the Hampton Institute. Before moving to Morehouse in 1967, Gloster taught at LeMoyne and Morehouse Colleges.

Morehouse College
Gloster was chosen as Morehouse's next president by Benjamin Mays, the previous president, with the agreement of Rev. Dr. Martin Luther King Jr., then on the board of trustees. He was the first alumnus president of Morehouse College.

Under Gloster's leadership the campus Morehouse doubled in size, as well as in the number of faculty members and their salaries.  After retiring he served on the Morehouse College Board of Trustees until his death.

Personal life
Gloster was married three times, to Louise Elisabeth Torrence, Beulah Victoria Harold, and Yvonne King Gloster. He had three children and four step-children.

On September 3, 1942 Gloster was beaten, arrested, and thrown off of the Jim Crow coach when he asked the conductor if two white occupants could move to another coach, due to overcrowding. Gloster signed a statement under duress and was fined $10, admitting to disorderly conduct and breaking Jim Crow law after he was threatened with a long jail term or a chain-gang sentence. Ironically, Spike Lee referenced Gloster as having voiced discriminating comments against Black people with dark complexion.  Lee stated that Gloster complained that the actor portraying the college president in "School Daze" was too dark skinned.

Death and legacy
Hugh Gloster died on January 16, 2002, at the age of 90. The Hugh Gloster building of the medical school is named for him.

Publications
 Negro Voices in American Fiction (1948)
 The Brown thrush : anthology of verse by Negro students (1935)

References

1911 births
2002 deaths
Presidents of Morehouse College
20th-century American academics